Animation is the interpolation of frames over a finite period of time. As a discipline, it is practiced with the intent of creating an illusion of movement.

Animation may also refer to:

 Animation (journal), an academic journal
 Animation (Cedar Walton album), 1978
 Animation Magazine, American publication covering the animation industry
 A style of popping where the dancer imitates stop motion animation

See also
 Animator
 Anime, Japanese animation
Amination, a process in organic chemistry
Animotion, a band from Los Angeles, California
 Animism, religious belief that perceives things as animated and alive